is a railway station in the city of Tendō, Yamagata, Japan, operated by East Japan Railway Company (JR East).

Lines
Midaregawa Station is served by the Ōu Main Line, and is located  rail kilometers from the terminus of the line at Fukushima Station.

Station layout
The station has one side platform serving a single bi-directional single track. The station is unattended.

History
Midaregawa Station opened on 1 December 1954. The station was absorbed into the JR East network upon the privatization of JNR on 1 April 1987.

Surrounding area
 Tendo Mokko

See also
List of railway stations in Japan

References

External links

 JR East Station information 

Stations of East Japan Railway Company
Railway stations in Yamagata Prefecture
Ōu Main Line
Railway stations in Japan opened in 1954
Tendō, Yamagata